{{DISPLAYTITLE:C12H19NO}}
The molecular formula C12H19NO (molar mass: 193.28 g/mol, exact mass: 193.1467 u) may refer to:

 Etafedrine
 Ethylephedrine
 Paramethoxyethylamphetamine